Juan Muñiz Gallego (born 14 March 1992) is a Spanish professional footballer who plays as a left winger for Malaysia Super League club Johor Darul Ta'zim.

Club career
Born in Gijón, Asturias, Muñiz was a product of Sporting de Gijón's prolific youth academy, Mareo. The 17-year-old made it to the reserves during the 2009–10 season, with the side playing in the Segunda División B.

Muñiz made his debut with the first team on 16 May 2010 in a 2–0 away loss against Racing de Santander, thus becoming the second youngest player ever to debut in La Liga for his hometown club, at the age of 18 years and 63 days. Shortly after being definitely promoted to the main squad, he scored his first Segunda División goal, closing the 2–3 home defeat to Real Murcia on 25 August 2012. 

On 5 August 2013, Muñiz was loaned to CD Mirandés of the same league in a season-long deal. On 8 July 2015, after achieving promotion to the top flight with Sporting by appearing in 29 matches and scoring three times, he renewed his contract until 2018. The following January, after having been rarely used during the campaign, he cut ties with the club and moved to Gimnàstic de Tarragona shortly after.

On 13 July 2018, free agent Muñiz signed a two-year deal with CD Lugo also in the second tier. On 14 August of the following year he was released and, three days later, joined Volos FC of the Football League Greece on a two-year contract.

Club statistics

Honours
Johor Darul Ta'zim
Piala Sumbangsih: 2023

Spain U19
UEFA European Under-19 Championship: 2011

References

External links

1992 births
Living people
Spanish footballers
Footballers from Gijón
Association football wingers
La Liga players
Segunda División players
Segunda División B players
Sporting de Gijón B players
Sporting de Gijón players
CD Mirandés footballers
Gimnàstic de Tarragona footballers
CD Lugo players
Super League Greece players
Volos N.F.C. players
Atromitos F.C. players
Malaysia Super League players
Johor Darul Ta'zim F.C. players
Spain youth international footballers
Spanish expatriate footballers
Expatriate footballers in Greece
Expatriate footballers in Malaysia
Spanish expatriate sportspeople in Greece
Spanish expatriate sportspeople in Malaysia